Finlit.uz is an online resource by the Central Bank of the Republic of Uzbekistan about financial literacy.

About the project 
A study conducted by International Finance Corporation, "Enhancing Financial Capability and Inclusion in Uzbekistan: A Demand-Side Assessment" showed that the level of financial literacy in the country is relatively low, respondents were able to answer barely over half (4.09 of 7) of financial literacy-related questions correctly. The majority of respondents were able to answer between 4 to 5 questions correctly (20 to 23 percent). According to the results of another study, "Financial Literacy Levels in the Commonwealth of Independent States in 2021" conducted by OECD, the level of financial literacy of the population in Uzbekistan was estimated as 12.6 out of 21 (or 59.9% out of 100%). 
Financial literacy initiatives are considered to be the main pillar to improve the well-being of citizens. In order to intensify mutual cooperation with stakeholders, a specific action plan was developed as a part of the National Strategy for Financial Inclusion.

Finlit.uz is an online educational resource designed to deliver the basics of finance and economy. The main goal is to increase financial knowledge, cultivate rational financial behavior and attitude, shape financial discipline, and maintain financial resilience. 
The name "Finlit" is derived from "financial literacy" in English.

Establishment 
Increasing the financial literacy of the population and business entities is stipulated as one of the tasks of the Central Bank in new adopted Law in 2019 “On the Central Bank of the Republic of Uzbekistan”. The Central Bank of Uzbekistan has developed a National Strategy for Financial Inclusion for 2021-2023 and became a coordinator of the educational projects on financial literacy. One of these projects - “Finlit.uz” online educational resource was launched on August 6, 2020.

Features 
The informative and broad content of the online resource is developed for schoolchildren, teachers, students and youth, entrepreneurs and the adult population, who desire to enhance financial knowledge. The website consists of:
- articles (money, budget, savings, credit, payments and transfers, financial market, monetary policy, currency regulation, entrepreneurship, consumer rights of banking services);
- training manuals (training materials for teachers, trainers, bank agents, educational videos, glossary);
- financial literacy projects of the Central Bank (global campaigns, contests, training and seminars, cooperation with mass media);
- interactive services (deposit and loan calculators, frequently asked questions).

The website's materials explain economic concepts, mechanisms, financial products and services in a simple way, provide cases, and highlight important aspects of financial decision-making.

Projects 
The Central Bank has been implementing a number of projects to increase the financial literacy of various target groups in cooperation with the Ministry of Higher and Secondary Special Education, the Ministry of Public Education, the Insurance Market Development Agency under the Ministry of Finance, IFC (the International Finance Corporation), commercial banks, fintech and insurance companies.

Seminars, training, roundtables, and meetings on increasing the financial literacy of the population are organized using the approach of ToT and ToC for stakeholders’ trainers, as well as with the help of Central Bank’s trainers.
These initiatives are mainly for children, youth, women, young families, entrepreneurs, migrants and their families.

Interactive projects and contests 
Visitors of the resource can find resources on projects and contents hold, which are designed using non-traditional teaching techniques such as “edutainment” and “learning by doing”.

Media content 
Sitcom, video clips, questionnaires, and various audio and video materials have been earning wide popularity through "Finlit.uz". These materials are designed using techniques such as, “teachable moments”, “infotainment”, and “make it social”.

References 

Personal finance education
Finance websites
Education in Uzbekistan
Educational websites
Internet properties established in 2020